Deir Sammit is a Palestinian town located eight kilometers west of Hebron. The town is in the Hebron Governorate Southern West Bank. According to the Palestinian Central Bureau of Statistics, the town had a population of over 6,237 in 2007.

History
An amulet composed of a very thin copper sheet with a Christian Palestinian Aramaic inscription was discovered at Deir Sammit.

Ottoman period 
In the early tax registers from the 1500s in the Ottoman Empire,  Deir Sammit was noted as being cultivated by the villagers of Suba.

In 1838, it was noted as a place "in ruins or deserted," part of the area between Hebron and Gaza, but under the jurisdiction of Hebron.

In 1863, Victor Guérin called the place Khirbet Deir Samit.

In 1883, the PEF's Survey of Palestine  noted "traces of ruins, caves, and cisterns" here.

British Mandate era
At the time of the 1931 census of Palestine the population of Deir Samit was counted under Dura.

Modern era
In the wake of the 1948 Arab–Israeli War, and after the 1949 Armistice Agreements, Deir Sammit came under Jordanian rule.  The Jordanian census of 1961 found 808 inhabitants in  Deir Sammit. 

After the Six-Day War in 1967, Deir Sammit has been under Israeli occupation. Since 1995, it has been governed by the Palestinian National Authority as part of Area B of the West Bank.

Footnotes

Bibliography

External links
Welcome to Dayr Samit
Deir Samet, Welcome to Palestine
Survey of Western Palestine, Map 21:    IAA, Wikimedia commons
Deir Samit Village (fact sheet),  Applied Research Institute–Jerusalem (ARIJ)
Deir Samit village profile, ARIJ
 Deir Samit  aerial photo, ARIJ
The priorities and needs for development in Deir Samit village based on the community and local authorities' assessment, ARIJ
 Constructing the Segregation Wall are in Deir Samit village – Hebron, September 23, 2004, POICA

Towns in the West Bank
Hebron Governorate
Municipalities of the State of Palestine